Mitogen-activated protein kinase kinase kinase 1 (MAP3K1) is a signal transduction enzyme that in humans is encoded by the autosomal MAP3K1 gene.

Function 

MAP3K1 (or MEKK1) is a serine/threonine kinase and ubiquitin ligase that performs a pivotal role in a network of enzymes integrating cellular receptor responses to a number of mitogenic and metabolic stimuli, including: TNF receptor superfamily (TNFRs), T-cell receptor (TCR), Epidermal growth factor receptor  (EGFR),  and TGF beta receptor (TGFβR). Mitogen-activated protein kinase kinases (MAP2Ks) are substrates for direct phosphorylation by the MAP3K1 protein kinase. The MAP3K1 kinase domain may also be a modest activator of IκB kinase activation. The MAP3K1 E3 ubiquitin ligase recruits a ubiquitin-conjugating enzyme (including UBE2D2, UBE2D3, and UBE2N:UBE2V1) that has been loaded with ubiquitin, interacts with its substrates, and facilitates the transfer of ubiquitin from the ubiquitin-conjugating enzyme onto its substrates. Genetics has revealed that MAP3K1 is important in: embryonic development, tumorigenesis, cell growth, cell migration, cytokine production, and humoral immunity. MAP3K1 mutants were identified in breast cancer by GWAS.

Structure 

MAP3K1 contains a protein kinase domain, PHD finger (which has a RING finger domain-like structure) that serves as an E3 ubiquitin ligase, and scaffold protein regions that mediate protein–protein interactions.

Genetic analyses in murine and avian models 

MAP3K1 is highly conserved in Euteleostomi. The spontaneous recessive lidgap-Gates mutation (deletion of Map3k1 exons 2–9, initially described in the 1960s) identified on the SELH/Bc mouse strain causes the same open-eyelids-at-birth mutational phenotype as the gene knockout mutations of the mouse (but not human) MAP3K1 homolog (Map3k1) and also co-maps to distal Chromosome 13. MAP3K1 was analysed genetically by targeted mutagenesis using transgenic mice (C57BL/6 and C57BL/6 × 129 backgrounds), embryonic stem cells, and the DT40 cell line to identify genetic traits.

Mechanism of MAPK activation by MAP3K1 
MAP3K1 contains multiple amino acid sites that are phosphorylated and ubiquitinated.  Early biochemical analysis demonstrated that triple co-expression of MAP3K1, MAP2K and MAPK in bacterial cells was sufficient for the activation of MAPK. Later analysis of syngenic mice that harbour mutations in TRAF2, UBE2N, Map3k1 and Map3k7 identified critical regulators of cytokine-induced MAPK signal transduction in B cells. Cytokine signaling through MAP3K1 utilises two-stage cell signaling to recruit the signal transduction mechanism to cytokine receptors and then release the signal transduction components, altered by post-translational modification, from the cellular membrane to activate MAPKs.  Genetic analysis has demonstrated that the E3 Ub ligase  and the kinase domains of MAP3K1 are required for MAPK activation.

Cancers, other diseases and therapeutic targeting 

MAP3K1 is a biomarker mutated in 3.24% of all human cancers. MAP3K1 has been associated with several diseases in non-syngeneic human populations, including: breast cancer, adenocarcinoma of the prostate, sarcomatoid hepatocellular carcinoma,  acute respiratory distress syndrome,  Langerhans cell histiocytosis, and 46,XY disorders of sex development. E6201 is an enzyme inhibitor of MAP3K1 that shows cross-specificity with MAP2K1.

Interaction partners 

MAP3K1 has been shown to interact with a number of proteins, including:
 AXIN1, 
 C-Raf, MAP2K1, MAPK1, 
 Grb2, 
 MAPK8, 
 TRAF2, 
 UBE2I.
 TAB1, TNIP1, TNIP2. Signal transducing adaptor molecule,
 Transforming protein RhoA,
 RAC1, CDC42,
 ARHGAP4,
 MAP2K4, and
 PTK2.

References

Further reading 

 

Mitogen-activated Protein Kinases
EC 2.7.11
Biomarkers